The Electric Warlock Acid Witch Satanic Orgy Celebration Dispenser is the sixth solo studio album by American heavy metal vocalist Rob Zombie. It was released on April 29, 2016.

Singles 
On January 27, 2016, "Well, Everybody's Fucking in a U.F.O." debuted on Sirius XM.

On March 17, 2016, "The Hideous Exhibitions of a Dedicated Gore Whore" was made available on iTunes if the album was preordered.

On April 14, 2016, the video for "In the Age of the Consecrated Vampire We All Get High" was released on YouTube.

Commercial performance 
The album debuted at number six on the Billboard 200 with 41,000 album-equivalent units; it sold 40,000 copies in its first week. It was the fifth-best-selling album of the week and spent three more in the Top 200 before falling off the chart. The Electric Warlock Acid Witch Satanic Orgy Celebration Dispenser became Zombie's sixth consecutive top ten album.

Track listing

Personnel 
 Rob Zombie – vocals
 John 5 – guitars
 Piggy D. – bass
 Ginger Fish – drums
 Zeuss – keyboards, programming

Charts

Weekly charts

Year-end charts

References

External links

2016 albums
Albums produced by Rob Zombie
Universal Music Group albums
Rob Zombie albums